Thomas Bowman (26 October 1873 – 27 August 1958) was a Scottish professional footballer who played as a half back in the 1902 FA Cup final for Southampton.

Playing career
Bowman began his professional career at Blackpool in 1896, making his debut in the club's first-ever game in the Football League, a 3–1 defeat at Lincoln City on 5 September. His thirty league appearances in 1896–97 made him an ever-present in the team.

He joined Aston Villa the following season where he gained a reputation as a strong, determined centre-half. He went on to make one hundred league appearances for the club (plus thirteen in the FA Cup) in four years, helping them to the League titles in 1898–99 and 1899-1900. Bowman was also in the Villa side that lost a 1900 FA cup quarter final against Millwall Athletic that stunned the football world at the time.

In 1901, Southern League champions Southampton, anxious to replace Arthur Chadwick, who had moved to Portsmouth, signed Bowman. In his first season at The Dell, Bowman helped Saints to the FA Cup final, whilst finishing only third in the Southern League.

In 1902–03 he was a key member of the team that claimed the Southern League title, a feat repeated the following season when Bowman appeared in all 34 matches. In his three years with the Saints he was a fixture in the half-back line and missed only five league games, making eighty-eight league and thirteen FA Cup appearances, scoring three goals.

Although he never received full international honours, he represented the Anglo-Scots against the Scots in 1902.

In 1904, he joined Chadwick at Portsmouth. In five years at Fratton Park, he made a total of 144 appearances, scoring five goals.

He finished his career with Eastleigh Athletic in 1912.

After retirement from football, he returned to his original trade as a boiler scaler, where he worked in Southampton Docks for many years.

Honours
Aston Villa
 Football League championship: 1898–99, 1899–1900

Southampton
 FA Cup finalist: 1902
 Southern League championship: 1902–03, 1903–04

References

Bibliography 

1873 births
People from Tarbolton
1958 deaths
English footballers
Association football midfielders
Blackpool F.C. players
Aston Villa F.C. players
Southampton F.C. players
Portsmouth F.C. players
Southern Football League players
Eastleigh Athletic F.C. players
Footballers from South Ayrshire
FA Cup Final players